Thomas Bolger (29 March 1882 – 1 May 1938) was an Irish Cumann na nGaedheal politician who was a Teachta Dála (TD) for two years in the 1920s.

Bolger was an unsuccessful Cumann na nGaedheal candidate in the Carlow–Kilkenny constituency at the 1923 general election. He stood again at a by-election on 11 March 1925, following the resignation of Carlow–Kilkenny TD Seán Gibbons, and was elected to the 4th Dáil.

He did not contest the June 1927 general election, but stood unsuccessfully in Carlow–Kilkenny as an independent candidate at the 1932 general election.

References

1882 births
1938 deaths
Cumann na nGaedheal TDs
Members of the 4th Dáil